Group F of the 2015 FIFA Women's World Cup consisted of France, England, Colombia and Mexico. Matches were played from 9 to 17 June 2015.

Teams

Standings

In the round of 16:
France advanced to play South Korea (runner-up of Group E).
England advanced to play Norway (runner-up of Group B).
Colombia (as one of the four best third-placed teams) advanced to play United States (winner of Group D).

Matches

France vs England

Colombia vs Mexico

France vs Colombia

England vs Mexico

Mexico vs France

England vs Colombia

References

External links
Official website

Group F
2015 in Colombian football
Group
2014–15 in Mexican football
Group